St Mark Coptic Orthodox Church (Coptic: // transliteration: ti.eklyseya en.remenkimi en.orthodoxos ente fi.ethowab Markos) is a Coptic Orthodox Church located in Burr Ridge, Illinois. The church is one of the largest in the Chicago area for Coptic Christians.

History

St Mark Coptic Orthodox Church was built in 1982. The church was named after St. Mark, one of Jesus's Apostles who founded the original church in Egypt after Jesus' death and resurrection.

In 1994, Magdy Wilson from Alexandria, Egypt was commissioned to create new and update current icons within the church. This was Wilson's first trip to the United States and the $200,000 project completed the interior of the church, a task that had been left incomplete in 1982 due to lack of funding.

The church was visited by Pope Shenouda III of Alexandria in 2001 in order to consecrate the church. This was the main purpose of his visit to the United States and his first visit to Chicago in 24 years.

In 2015, due to the increasing church congregation, it was expanded.

See also

 List of Coptic Orthodox Churches in the United States
 Mark the Evangelist

References

External links
 St. Mark Chicago Homepage

Churches in Cook County, Illinois
Coptic Orthodox churches in the United States
Eastern Orthodox churches in Illinois
Middle Eastern-American culture in Illinois